The enzyme aspartate ammonia-lyase (EC 4.3.1.1)  catalyzes the chemical reaction

L-aspartate  fumarate + NH3

The reaction is the basis of the industrial synthesis of aspartate.

This enzyme belongs to the family of lyases, specifically ammonia lyases, which cleave carbon-nitrogen bonds.  The systematic name of this enzyme class is L-aspartate ammonia-lyase (fumarate-forming). Other names in common use include aspartase, fumaric aminase, L-aspartase, and L-aspartate ammonia-lyase.  This enzyme participates in alanine and aspartate metabolism and nitrogen metabolism.

Structural studies

References

 

EC 4.3.1
Enzymes of known structure